Look What We Made is a four-track EP that was released on October 31, 2008, by Phoenix, Arizona pop rock band This Century.

Track listing

Personnel
Members
 Joel Kanitz – Vocals
 Sean Silverman – Guitar
 Alex Silverman – Bass, keyboard
 Ryan Gose – Drums

References

External links 
 iTunes | Look What We Made EP
 Spotify | Look What We Made EP
 
 Facebook
 Twitter
 Youtube

2008 EPs